Daniel Lloyd Davey (born 25 July 1973), known professionally as Dani Filth, is a British singer who is the vocalist, lyricist and founding member of the extreme metal band Cradle of Filth. He has a five-octave vocal range.

Personal life 
Daniel Lloyd Davey was born to Susan Janet Moore and Laurence John Davey in Hertford and is the eldest child of four.

He married his wife Toni on 31 October 2005 in Ipswich. The couple have a daughter, Luna. Filth and Toni have been separated since 2018.

Career 
Dani Filth's present and primary band is Cradle of Filth. He also has been lending his voice to the band Devilment, a side project that has taken off into a full-time job in between Cradle records. His earliest bands were Carnival Fruitcake, The Lemon Grove Kids, PDA, Feast on Excrement, the Bondage Boys, and Hash Gordon and the Drug Barons. He named Judas Priest, Venom, Emperor, Destruction, Slayer, Iron Maiden, Sabbat, Misfits, Paradise Lost and Tim Burton's The Nightmare Before Christmas among his major influences.

At the age of eighteen, Filth took up a job at a Chinese restaurant. He later chose his career in music over an internship at a newspaper, although his "Dani's Inferno" column ran for two years in Metal Hammer during the late 1990s.

He has co-written and released The Gospel of Filth with Gavin Baddeley. The book, which Filth describes as an "occult study," features contributions from Clive Barker, Christopher Lee and Ingrid Pierson. He had been accused many times of being a Satanist, but has denounced such rumours, claiming instead to being "more of a Luciferian."

Away from Cradle, Filth appeared on the Roadrunner United CD in 2005 (contributing vocals to "Dawn of a Golden Age"), and recorded the song "(She's) The Mother of Tears" with Claudio Simonetti and Simonetti's band Daemonia, for the soundtrack of Dario Argento's film The Mother of Tears.

Filth participated in the Temple of the Black Moon project in 2012 with guitarist Rob Caggiano, black metal musician King ov Hell on bass, and drummer John Tempesta. The supergroup aimed to combine rawer, extreme metal with the softer more melodious sounds of progressive rock, describing the band's sound as a "cross between Celtic Frost and Tool". Filth has also released two albums with Devilment since 2014.

His high-profile has led to a handful of film and television roles. In 2003, he provided the voice of the eponymous main character in the feature-length animation Dominator. Moreover, Filth has appeared numerous times on British television, most notably 1998's Living With the Enemy, Never Mind the Buzzcocks in 2001, Big Brother's Big Mouth in 2008. He has also appeared on the American series Viva La Bam in 2005, and was interviewed for two episodes of the Metal Evolution series, on shock rock and extreme metal in 2012 and 2014 respectively.

In 2010, he was ranked 95 in the Hit Parader's Top 100 Metal Vocalists of All Time.

Scottish death metal band Party Cannon dedicated Dani the song "I Believe in Dani Filth", released in December 2021 with an animated version of Dani in a Street Fighter-styled video.

Cradle of Fear 
In 2000, Filth appeared in the movie Cradle of Fear as The Man, a deranged psychopath taking revenge on his father's persecutors. Cradle of Fear unfolds four stories all linked by the thread of an incarcerated child killer wreaking vengeance on those responsible for his imprisonment. The movie's tagline on some posters was, "It's not if they die... It's how...".

Discography

Cradle of Filth 

The Principle of Evil Made Flesh (1994)
Dusk... and Her Embrace (1996)
Cruelty and the Beast (1998)
Midian (2000)
Damnation and a Day (2003)
Nymphetamine (2004)
Thornography (2006)
Godspeed on the Devil's Thunder (2008)
Darkly, Darkly, Venus Aversa (2010)
The Manticore and Other Horrors (2012)
Hammer of the Witches (2015)
Cryptoriana – The Seductiveness of Decay (2017)
Existence Is Futile (2021)

Devilment 
The Great and Secret Show (2014)
Devilment II – The Mephisto Waltzes (2016)

Guest appearances 
 Christian Death – "Zodiac (He Is Still Out There...)" and "Peek a Boo" from the album Born Again Anti Christian (2000)
 Obsidian – "Massada" from the On the Path of Others We Feed (EP) (2000)
 Roadrunner United (2005) – Lead vocals on "Dawn of a Golden Age"
 Claudio Simonetti – "Mater Lacrimarum" from The Third Mother Soundtrack (2007)
 Sarah Jezebel Deva – "This Is My Curse" from the Malediction (EP) (2012)
 Motionless in White – "Puppets 3 (The Grand Finale)" from the album Reincarnate (2014)
 Schoolcraft – "Fading Star" (2014)
 Simone Simons – "The Creator and the Destroyer" from the rock opera Karmaflow (2015)
 Eastern Front – "Crimson Mourn" from the album EmpirE (2016)
 Bring Me the Horizon – "Wonderful Life" from the album Amo (2019) (#35 US Billboard Hot Mainstream Rock Tracks)
 Twiztid – "Neon Vamp" from the album Unlikely Prescription (2021)

References

External links 

Official Cradle of Filth site
Interview with Dani Filth at SuicideGirls.com

1973 births
20th-century English male singers
20th-century English singers
21st-century English male singers
21st-century English singers
Cradle of Filth members
Singers with a five-octave vocal range
English heavy metal singers
English Luciferians
English rock singers
Living people
People from Hertford
Musicians from Ipswich
Musicians from Hertfordshire
Musicians from Suffolk